Ozyptila elegans is a crab spider species found in Italy.

References

External links 

elegans
Spiders of Europe
Fauna of Italy
Spiders described in 1870